Machiavel, named after Niccolò Machiavelli, is a Belgian rock group formed in 1974 and still currently recording and touring today. The band's first few albums are typical of the progressive rock movement while the later albums were more in a new-wave rock direction. By mid 1970s, Machiavel had established themselves as one of the most popular Belgian groups.

History

The first years
Machiavel were founded in 1974 by Roland De Greef (bass) and Marc Ysaÿe (drums and vocals) then playing with a group called Moby Dick and Jack Roskam (guitar) and Albert Letecheur (keyboard). They released their first eponymous album in 1976 and gained some attention with the song "Cheerlessness" displaying Marc's high pitch voice and Albert's heady keyboard line.

Jack Roskam was soon replaced by Jean-Paul Devaux and Mario Guccio joined the group as lead vocalist and showman, due to his move out to Yugoslavia.  The new formation released Jester in 1977. The next year saw the release of the album, Mechanical Moonbeams.

Urban Games was probably the band's most successful album to date. It attempted to move away from the Eurock style and proposed songs leaning on disco ("Dancing Heroes"), hard rock ("The Dictators"), reggae ("Over the Hill"), and Eurock still ("City Flowers"). The rift between the tastes and ideas of the different members of the group was all too apparent in the group and Albert Letecheur and Jean-Paul Devaux left the group in 1979.

New directions
The aptly titled album New Lines, with Thierry Plas on lead guitar, was released in 1980.  The single "Fly" was an immediate success but the group's next attempt with the album Break Out produced by Derek Laurence in 1981 did not meet success and the group went undercover for a number of years, if one excepts the album The Cry of Pleasure in 1987.

Rebirth
The rebirth happened in 1999 with Virtual Sun followed by Welcome to Paradise in 2003 and 2005 in 2005. Although live performances have been promoted the band fails to recapture its former glory after such a long absence. In 2010 Thierry Plas left the band because of musical differences and went in search of other projects. A new album Eleven was released featuring new guitarist Christophe Pons. 

Members are active in radio and promoting and supporting new acts, especially in the Belgian market, which has become two markets due to schisms among the two major linguistic groups in Belgium, which operate separate radio and television systems.

Aftermath
Their lead vocalist since 1977, Mario Guccio, died at the age of 64, on 21 January 2018.

Band members

Discography

Studio albums
 Machiavel (EMI, 1976, LP Vinyl)
 Jester (EMI, 1977, LP Vinyl)
 Mechanical Moonbeams (EMI, 1978, LP Vinyl)
 Urban Games (EMI, 1979, LP Vinyl)
 New Lines (EMI, 1980, LP Vinyl)
 Break Out (EMI, 1981, LP Vinyl)
 Valentine's Day (EMI, 1982, LP Vinyl)
 The Cry Of Pleasure (INDISC, 1987, LP Vinyl)
 40th Anniversary (2015, Vinyl, Limited Edition, Special Edition)

Compilation albums
 The Best of Machiavel (EMI, 1991, CD)

Reissues
 Machiavel (EMI, 1993, CD)
 Jester (EMI, 1993, CD)
 Mechanical Moonbeams (EMI, 1993, CD)
 Urban Games (EMI, 1993, CD)
 New Lines (EMI, 1993, CD)
 20th Anniversary Machiavel – The Very Best Of (EMI, 1996, CD)
 Virtual Sun (CNR Arcade, 1999, CD)
 Machiavel Live (EMI, 1999, CD)
 Break Out (Hans Kuster Music, 2000, CD)
 Original Hits (EMI, 2000, CD)
 Anthology (EMI, 2001, CD)
 Welcome to Paradise (CNR Arcade, 2003, CD)
 The Essential of Machiavel (2003, EMI, CD)
 Mechanical Moonbeams (2005, EMI, CD)
 2005 (2005, Bang, CD)
 Best of Machiavel (2006, More Than Télémoustique, CD)
 Acoustic (2009, Moonzoo Music, CD)
 Eleven (2011, Moonzoo Music, CD)
 Colours (2013, Moonzoo Music, CD)

See also
Belgian rock

References

External links
 The official Machiavel site

Belgian rock music groups
Belgian pop music groups